Genevive Delali Tsegah (born 8 August 1951) is a Ghanaian diplomat.

Education 
In 1976, Tsegah completed a degree in Modern Languages at the University of Ghana, followed by a degree in International Relations at the University of Nairobi in 1982.

Career
Tsegah joined the diplomatic service in 1977, as a civil servant in the Culture Department of the Ministry of Foreign Affairs, a post she held until 1981. From 1982 to 1983 she was an official in the Middle East and Asia Department, then at the Ministry of Foreign Affairs, until 1985. In 1988 she took up a post for one year in the department of the Americas, before becoming a member of the Senate in Paris, where she stayed for the next four years. In 1993, she became Deputy Director of the Department for Economics, Trade and Investment, until 1996, when she moved to Cotonou, Benin, where she worked as an adviser and also a business manager from 1997 to 1998. From 2000 to 2002, she was Head of the Department for Economics, Trade and Investment, before serving for four years as ambassador in Ouagadougou, Burkina Faso (2002–06). She then returned to become director of the Department of Economics, Trade and Investment of the Ministry of Foreign Affairs for two more years.

From 2008 to 2009 she was the representative of the Permanent Representative at the United Nations Headquarters in New York City. From 15 January 2010 to 14 October 2014 she was Ambassador of the Republic of Ghana to Paris, and was accredited by UNESCO and the Holy See.

References 

1951 births
Living people
Ambassadors of Ghana to France
Ghanaian women ambassadors